Flame of Recca is a Japanese manga series written and illustrated by Nobuyuki Anzai. The plot follows the protagonist Recca Hanabishi, a teenage ninja with the ability to manipulate fire and a descendant of the Hokage, a ninja clan wiped out centuries ago.

The Flame of Recca manga was originally serialized in Weekly Shōnen Sunday from 1995 to 2002, with a total of 329 chapters. The series was compiled into 33 tankōbon (collected volumes) and was published by Shogakukan from September 18, 1995 to April 18, 2002. Shogakukan also released the manga in 17 wideban volumes and, beginning in 2010, as part of its Comic Bunko label. The manga was licensed for North American distribution in English by Viz Media and United Kingdom distribution in English by Gollancz Manga. Viz released all 33 volumes from July 30, 2003 to November 10, 2009, while Gollancz released ten volumes between March 6 and November 28, 2006.



Volume list

References

External links
 Flame of Recca at Viz Media
 Flame of Recca at Shonen Sunday

Flame of Recca